Darren Charles Barnet (born April 27, 1991) is an American actor. He is known for playing Paxton Hall-Yoshida in the Netflix series Never Have I Ever.

Early life and education
Darren Charles Barnet was born on April 27, 1991, in Los Angeles. His mother is of Swedish and Japanese descent, while his father is of German and Cherokee descent. Barnet's grandfather was swing musician Charlie Barnet. Barnet has an older and a younger sister.

Barnet and his mother relocated to the suburbs of Orlando, Florida, when he was 12 years old. He graduated from Dr. Phillips High School in 2009, where he was the lacrosse team captain. He graduated from Berry College with a Bachelor of Arts in 2013, where he acted in plays and short films. Since the age of five, he wanted to be an actor but did not seriously pursue acting until college. In addition to English, he speaks Japanese and conversational Spanish, and has studied French.

Career
After graduating in 2013, Barnet returned to Los Angeles to become an actor. He worked at SoulCycle on Sunset Boulevard as a bike attendant and front desk associate. He got his California real estate license in May 2015. He made his acting debut in 2017.

In 2017, Barnet had episodic roles in the television shows: This Is Us, S.W.A.T., and Criminal Minds.

In 2018, Barnet starred as Hot Seth in the Brat-produced Facebook Watch limited streaming television series Turnt. That same year, he appeared in a supporting role in the Lifetime original television movie Instakiller, which marked his film debut.

In 2019, Barnet starred in an episodic role in the Netflix sitcom Family Reunion.

In April 2020, Barnet began starring in the Netflix teen comedy-drama streaming television series Never Have I Ever, as Paxton Hall-Yoshida, the crush of Devi Vishwakumar, the show's lead character, played by Maitreyi Ramakrishnan. Media noted the nearly 11-year age difference between Barnet and Ramakrishnan, with Barnet being 29 at the beginning of the show. Co-creator Lang Fisher talked about Barnet and the audition process. She mentioned for the heartthrob of the show, she imagined him to the guy that you just swoon over. "Darren was so good at the swoon-y stuff-being an aloof, cool guy-but he was actually very good at the comedy stuff in his audition, too." She continued, "You can't ask someone how old they are when they audition. You just have to assume that they're a reasonable age. I don't think we found out what his age was until we were deep in the season and then we were like, 'Oh, OK.' I assumed he was, like, 20. And the other thing I will say, when you see an actual 15-year-old boy, they're just not going to be a heartthrob. They look like a tiny baby." Both Never Have I Ever and Barnet's performance received positive reviews, with Netflix reporting that the series had been viewed by 40 million households globally since its release. The following month, he appeared in a brief role as character Wilfred Malick in the seventh season of ABC and Marvel's television series Agents of S.H.I.E.L.D. Later that year, Barnet starred in Universal Pictures' direct-to-video sex comedy film American Pie Presents: Girls' Rules.

In 2021, Barnet starred alongside an ensemble cast in the horror comedy film Untitled Horror Movie. The film was released on Prime Video, iTunes, and Vudu; and was positively received by critics and audiences, with praise for the cast's performances. In July 2021, he reprised his role as Paxton Hall-Yoshida in the second season of Netflix's Never Have I Ever. The season and Barnet's performance were well received. In November 2021, Barnet starred in the Netflix Christmas romantic comedy film Love Hard, alongside Nina Dobrev and Jimmy O. Yang.

In April 2022, Barnet became the first male brand ambassador for Victoria's Secret PINK, and the brand's "Gender Free" collection. Later that month, he starred in the voice role of the protagonist Yuichi Usagi in Netflix's CGI-animated action-comedy series Samurai Rabbit: The Usagi Chronicles.

Barnet returned for the third season of Never Have I Ever; principal photography began towards the end of November 2021 and wrapped up in late February 2022. It premiered on August 12, 2022, on Netflix.

Upcoming work 
Barnet is set to star alongside Timothy V. Murphy, Bailey Noble, Zac Weinstein, and Yasmin Wijnaldum and serve as a producer on Michael Leo DeAngelo's upcoming psychological thriller drama film Apophenia, which is expected to release sometime later in 2022. Barnet has also signed on to voice a series regular in Netflix's upcoming action-adventure anime series Blue Eye Samurai, which will also star Maya Erskine, George Takei, Masi Oka, Randall Park, Cary-Hiroyuki Tagawa, and Brenda Song in voice roles.

Barnet has been confirmed to star in season 4 of Never Have I Ever.

Filmography

Film

Television

References

External links

Living people
Male actors from Los Angeles
Male actors from Orlando, Florida
Berry College alumni
21st-century American male actors
American male actors of Japanese descent
American people of German descent
American people of Swedish descent
American people of Cherokee descent
American male film actors
American film actors of Asian descent
American male web series actors
American male television actors
American male voice actors
Dr. Phillips High School alumni
1991 births